Calystegia pubescens, commonly known as Japanese bindweed, is a species of bindweed. This is a small climbing plant that grows to 20~70 centimeters in height. The corolla is partially pink and is under 4 cm long. This species is a weedy wildflower distributed in South Korea, Japan, and countries in south-eastern Asia. It is able to be distinguished from other bindweeds by its foliage having divided side lobes.

References

pubescens